The 1975 Montana Grizzlies football team was an American football team that represented the University of Montana in the Big Sky Conference during the 1975 NCAA Division II football season. In their ninth year under head coach Jack Swarthout, the team compiled a 6–4 record.

Schedule

Roster

References

Montana
Montana Grizzlies football seasons
Montana Grizzlies football